American singer and songwriter Jason Derulo has released four studio albums, one re-issued album, two compilation albums, four extended plays, 52 singles (including 14 as a featured artist), six promotional singles, and 37 music videos (including six as a featured artist). Before Derulo established himself as a solo artist, he wrote songs for many artists, including Lil Wayne, Pitbull, Pleasure P and Cassie. He also wrote "Bossy" for rapper Birdman, and made a guest appearance on the song, which highlighted his ability as a vocalist.

After signing with Beluga Heights Records, Derulo released his debut single "Whatcha Say" in May 2009. It reached number one on the Billboard Hot 100 and was certified triple platinum by the Recording Industry Association of America (RIAA). The song served as the lead single from Derulo's self-titled debut studio album, which was released on March 2, 2010, and reached number 11 on the
Billboard 200. "In My Head" and "Ridin' Solo" were released as the album's second and third singles respectively. While both attained peaks within the top 10 in multiple countries, "In My Head" became Derulo's first number-one single in the likes of Australia and the United Kingdom. A further two singles were released from the album: "What If" and "The Sky's the Limit".

Derulo's second studio album Future History was released on September 16, 2011. Lead single "Don't Wanna Go Home" preceded its release in May 2011; where it became the artist's second number-one single in the United Kingdom. the second single taken from the album, "It Girl" also achieved success, reaching the top five in Australia, New Zealand and the United Kingdom. "Breathing" and "Fight for You" were also released from the album in 2011; with both attaining top 10 peaks in Australia. In May 2012, Derulo released "Undefeated" as the first and only single from the re-release of Future History. Despite managing to reach number 14 in Australia, "Undefeated" performed poorly on the Billboard Hot 100, reaching number 90 and failing to chart altogether in the United Kingdom.

In April 2013, Derulo unveiled the lead single from his third studio album; Tattoos, "The Other Side" saw Derulo return to the top five in Canada for the first time since 2009, reaching number 17 in the United States and the top five in Australia and the United Kingdom. Derulo's third studio album in the US, Talk Dirty, outsold his previous best debut Jason Derulo and included two top 10 platinum singles: "Talk Dirty" and "Wiggle". As of 2015, Derulo has sold 28 million albums and songs combined in the US.

Derulo released his fourth album Everything Is 4 in May 2015. It produced the worldwide hit single "Want to Want Me", which peaked at number 5 on the Billboard Hot 100 and topped the UK Singles Chart for four weeks.

In 2020, Derulo's single "Savage Love (Laxed – Siren Beat)" peaked at number one on the Billboard Hot 100, marking his first top 10 hit in five years.

Albums

Studio albums

Re-issued albums

Compilation albums

Extended plays

Singles

As lead artist

As featured artist

Promotional singles

Other charted songs

Guest appearances

Music videos

Notes

References

External links
 Official website
 Jason Derulo at AllMusic
 
 

Discography
Discographies of American artists
Pop music discographies
Rhythm and blues discographies